Paul-Jules de la Porte-Vezins, known as the "Marquis de la Porte-Vezins" (born 3 December 1727, Parthenay; date of death unknown) was a French naval officer and aristocrat. He fought in the War of the Austrian Succession, the Seven Years' War and the American Revolutionary War, ending his career at the rank of chef d'escadre (1784) and as director general and second-in-command of Brest.

Sources
Alexandre Mazas, Histoire de l'ordre royal et Militaire de Saint-Louis depuis son institution en 1693 jusqu'en 1830, vol. 2, Paris, Firmin Didot frères, fils et Cie, 1860, p. 187

French Navy admirals
1727 births
People from Deux-Sèvres
French military personnel of the War of the Austrian Succession
French military personnel of the Seven Years' War
French military personnel of the American Revolutionary War
French nobility
French Royalist military leaders of the French Revolutionary Wars
French emigrants to the Kingdom of Great Britain